Peder Hansen may refer to:

Peder Hansen (bishop) (1746–1810), Danish bishop
Peder Hansen (politician) (1859–?), Norwegian politician